The Seward neighborhood in Minneapolis, Minnesota, United States, is geographically southeast of downtown, consisting of the land bordered by the Hiawatha Avenue industrial district to the west, Minneapolis Midtown Greenway (between E. 27th St. and E. 28th St.) to the south, the Mississippi River to the east, and Interstate 94 to the north. Seward's bordering neighborhoods are Cooper to the southeast, Longfellow to the south, East Phillips to the southwest, Ventura Village to the west, Cedar-Riverside to the north, and Prospect Park/East River Road across the Mississippi River to the east. It is one of the neighborhoods that is part of the larger Longfellow community. Seward was named after former New York senator, governor, and US Secretary of State William H. Seward.

The neighborhood includes a number of local businesses along Franklin Avenue including two cooperatives, Seward Co-op (a grocery store) and Seward Community Cafe. The neighborhood is also home to the Milwaukee Avenue Historic District, Northern Clay Center, ArtiCulture and The Playwrights' Center.

Civic information
Politically, Seward is progressive-left, with the Democratic-Farmer-Labor Party and Green Party having political dominance. The Seward Neighborhood Group is the area's neighborhood organization.

Schools
One public school is located in the neighborhood, Seward Montessori School (using the Montessori method for grades K-8). Attached to the school is Matthews Park and Recreation Center. Anne Sullivan Communication Center (emphasizing programs for the deaf and visually impaired)  is located just across the greenway in the Longfellow neighborhood.  Students from Seward Neighborhood can walk to both these schools.

Population

The population of Seward in the 2010 U.S. Census was 7,308. Median household income in 1999 was $30,209. Approximately 18 percent of the population lived below poverty level in 1999, including 13 percent of families. The median house value in 2000 was $112,000.

See also
Neighborhoods of Minneapolis

References

External links
Seward Neighborhood Group
Seward Neighbors Forum

Neighborhoods in Minneapolis
Minnesota populated places on the Mississippi River